Niederwinkling is a municipality  in the district of Straubing-Bogen in Bavaria, Germany. It is a member of the municipal association Schwarzach.

References

Straubing-Bogen